Larsen Glacier is a glacier flowing southeast from Reeves Neve, through the Prince Albert Mountains and entering the Ross Sea just south of Mount Crummer in Victoria Land, Antarctica. It was discovered by the South Magnetic Party of Ernest Shackleton's British Antarctic Expedition, 1907–09, who followed its course on their way to the plateau area beyond. They named it Larsen Glacier because it flowed past the foot of Mount Larsen, which was constantly in view as they ascended the course of the glacier.

References

Glaciers of Victoria Land
Scott Coast